"I'll Try Something New" is a song written by Smokey Robinson and originally released in 1962 by The Miracles on  Motown Records' Tamla subsidiary label. Their version was a Billboard Top 40 hit, peaking at #39, and just missed the Top 10 of its R&B chart, peaking at #11.
The song was released later as a joint single by Diana Ross & the Supremes and The Temptations, also becoming a charting version on the Billboard 100 pop singles chart, peaking for two weeks in April 1969 at number 25.

Background

Song information
In the song, the narrator (Smokey Robinson) describes how if he feels that if his first attempt at trying to show his lover affection was not good enough, then he'd try something new to keep their love alive:
{{cquote|I will build you a castle with a tower so high it reaches the Moon. I'll gather melodies from birdies that fly and compose you a tune. Give you lovin' warm as Mama's oven, and if that don't do, then I'll try something new.}}
The Miracles issued the original version of the song in 1962, and with wife and fellow Miracles member Claudette's voice clearly audible in the chorus (hey Venus...). Smokey and Motown founder Berry Gordy produced the song with an Oriental feel to it, with unusually lush-for-the-period orchestration and sweeping strings, showcasing The Miracles' harmonies and Robinson's production style.

The Miracles' original version peaked number 39 on the Billboard Hot 100 pop charts and number 11 on the R&B singles chart. It became the title track from their 1962 album, I'll Try Something New''.

Personnel

Miracles version
Lead vocals by Smokey Robinson
Background vocals by Claudette Rogers Robinson, Pete Moore, Ronnie White and Bobby Rogers
Guitarist Marv Tarplin
Instrumentation by The Funk Brothers and the Detroit Symphony Orchestra

Supremes and Temptations version
Lead vocals by Diana Ross, Eddie Kendricks and Melvin Franklin
Background vocals by Mary Wilson, Cindy Birdsong, Dennis Edwards, Eddie Kendricks, Paul Williams, Melvin Franklin and Otis Williams
Instrumentation by The Funk Brothers, the Detroit Symphony Orchestra, and various Los Angeles area musicians

Chart history

Miracles version

The Supremes and The Temptations version

Track listing
7" single (20 February 1969) (North America) (Diana Ross & the Supremes/The Temptations)
"I'll Try Something New" – 2:18
"The Way You Do the Things You Do" – 1:39

Cover versions
In 1966, R&B artist Spyder Turner covered the song as an excerpt of his hit cover of the Ben E King song "Stand by Me".  Several years later, in 1969, the group's Motown label-mates The Supremes and The Temptations released a duet version that became a hit reaching number 25 on the Hot 100 and number 8 on the R&B chart. Disco/pop group A Taste of Honey also covered the song 20 years later, in 1982 peaking at number 41 on the Hot 100 and number 9 on the R&B chart.

Singer/actress Barbara McNair also recorded a version of “I’ll Try Something New” for Motown. Backed  by Los Angeles-based area musicians and produced by Frank Wilson and Richard Morris, McNair’s version also included background vocals by The Andantes. The McNair cover is included on “The Ultimate Motown Collection,” which includes both of her released albums as well as the unreleased “Barbara Sings Smokey” album.

References

External links
 

1962 singles
1969 singles
1982 singles
The Miracles songs
The Supremes songs
The Temptations songs
Tamla Records singles
Songs written by Smokey Robinson
Song recordings produced by Berry Gordy
Song recordings produced by Smokey Robinson
1962 songs